Pocho volcanic field is a volcanic field in Argentina. It is associated with a crustal lineament known as the Ojo de Agua Lineament.

It is located in the Sierras de Cordoba mountain chain. It formed during the late Miocene, when a progressive shallowing of the subducting Nazca Plate caused volcanic activity to retreat  from the main Andes into the land behind the mountain chain. This did result in a typical shallow slab chemistry of the Pocho rocks. Volcanic activity at Pocho is dated about 4.7 +- 0.3 million years ago and took place over two cycles. Seismic activity in the area may indicate the presence of a residual magma chamber however, which would also explain anomalous crustal seismic velocities in the area.

References

External links 
 

Volcanoes of Argentina
Miocene volcanism